Walshia amorphella is a moth in the family Cosmopterigidae. It was described by James Brackenridge Clemens in 1864. It is found in North America, where it has been recorded from Illinois, Iowa, Kentucky, Minnesota and from Kansas to Texas.

References

Arctiidae genus list. Butterflies and Moths of the World. Natural History Museum, London.

Moths described in 1864
Chrysopeleiinae